Nikita Vasilyevich Petrov (born 31 January 1957, Kiev) is a Russian historian. He works at Memorial, a Russian organization dedicated to studying Soviet political repression. Petrov specializes in Soviet security services.

The book about  Nikolai Ezhov written by Nikita Petrov and Marc Jansen is based on the archives made accessible after the dissolution of the Soviet Union. Petrov's part was tracking original archival documents, while Jansen worked with published sources.

On March 24, 2005 Nikita Petrov was awarded Knight's Cross of the Order of Merit of the Republic of Poland for his efforts in uncovering truth about repressions against Polish people during the war.

In 2008 Petrov earned Ph.D. from the University of Amsterdam (Instituut voor Cultuur en Geschiedenis, Faculty of Humanities) with the thesis "Сталин и органы НКВД-МГБ в советизации стран Центральной и Восточной Европы. 1945–1953 гг."

Articles by Petrov were published in the Novaya Gazeta.

Bibliography

Petrov's video lectures

External links

References

1957 births
Living people
Writers from Kyiv
D. Mendeleev University of Chemical Technology of Russia alumni
University of Amsterdam alumni
20th-century Russian historians
Historians of Russia
21st-century Russian historians
Stalinism-era scholars and writers
Memorial (society)
Academic staff of the Russian State University for the Humanities
Academic staff of Moscow State University
Knights of the Order of Merit of the Republic of Poland
Russian historians of espionage